Raid Rasheed Abbas (born January 1, 1976, in Baghdad) is an Iraqi taekwondo practitioner, who competed in the men's welterweight category at the 2004 Summer Olympics.

Rasheed qualified as a lone taekwondo fighter for the Iraqi squad in the men's welterweight class (80 kg) at the 2004 Summer Olympics in Athens, by granting a tripartite invitation from the International Taekwondo Federation under the Olympic Solidarity program. Rasheed suffered in a merciless 0–12 defeat to U.S. taekwondo jin and eventual Olympic champion Steven López during his opening match, stimulating a mighty hoot and a raucous chant "Iraq, Iraq!" from the majority of the crowd inside Faliro Coastal Zone Olympic Complex. Following Lopez' progress towards the final, Rasheed was scheduled to fight against Mexico's Víctor Estrada in the first playoff of the repechage bracket, but pulled himself out of tournament due to injuries sustained from the opening bout.

References

External links

1976 births
Living people
Iraqi male taekwondo practitioners
Olympic taekwondo practitioners of Iraq
Taekwondo practitioners at the 2004 Summer Olympics
Sportspeople from Baghdad